Heinrich Brück (25 October 1831, Bingen – 4 November 1903) was a German Catholic church historian, and Bishop of Mainz.

Life
He followed for some time the cooper's trade. After a course of studies under of a distinguished ecclesiastic, Dr. Joseph Hirschel, he entered the seminary at Mainz. He was ordained to the priesthood in 1855, exercised for some time the ministry, and made a postgraduate course at Munich under Ignaz von Döllinger, and at Rome. In 1867 he was appointed to the chair of ecclesiastical history in the seminary of Mainz.

He continued to teach until his elevation to the episcopate, with the exception of the years from 1878 to 1887, when seminary was closed by the order of the Government due to the Kulturkampf. In 1889 he became a canon of Mainz Cathedral; he received also several positions of trust in the administration of the diocese. In 1899 he was chosen to be Bishop of Mainz.

Works

Perhaps his best known work is his manual of church history, from "Lehrbuch der Kirchengeschichte" (Mainz, 1874; 8th ed., 1902). It has been translated into English, French, and Italian. The author showed himself possessed of extensive knowledge not only in history, but also in theology and canon law. A more special work is his "Geschichte der katholischen Kirche in Deutschland im neunzehnten Jahrhundert"—History of the catholic Church in Germany in the Nineteenth Century", in five volumes (1887-1905).

He was also the author of an account of rationalistic movements in Catholic Germany (1865), a life of Dean Lennig (1870), and a work on secret societies in Spain (1881).

External links
 
Catholic Encyclopedia article

1831 births
1903 deaths
Bishops of Mainz (1802-present)
19th-century German historians
German male non-fiction writers